Cuba competed at the 1928 Summer Olympics in Amsterdam, Netherlands. The only competitor was Jose Eduardo Barrientos Schweyer (1904-1945) who was 24 years old when he competed in the Men's 100 metres. He reached the second round where he finished fifth in the fourth heat. He is known as "El Relampago del Caribe" (Caribbean's Thunder).

Athletics

Key
Note–Ranks given for track events are within the athlete's heat only
Q = Qualified for the next round

Men
Track & road events

References
Official Olympic Reports

Nations at the 1928 Summer Olympics
1928
1928 in Cuba